Dar al-Manasir is the region of the Fourth Cataract, the most impassable of all rapids of the Nile. It is the homeland of the Arab tribe of the Manasir and from them gets its name. Still today the water rapids cannot be crossed by any large boats making the region accessible only via a sandy and rocky desert track.

At the height of the Island of Muqrat (N 19°30') the Nile river is blocked from its northward course taking a sharp turn SSW for 280 kilometres before continuing to flow north. In the middle of this S-shape between the Bayudah Desert to the south and the Nubian Desert to the north, the Nile is forced by the topography to split up into a multitude of tributaries forming a fertile river oasis of small rocky islands described by the traveller GRAY (1949:120) with the following words: "Whereas usually [agriculture] in the Nile Valley […] is confined to the belt on two banks on which the river has deposited silt, in this cataract area, where islands are scattered like a flock of goats, the number of silt-covered river banks in any given 10 kilometres may be up to a dozen".

Dar al-Manasir will be successively flooded by the Merowe Dam project.

Extent 

Dar al-Manasir is confined by the upstream living Rubatab tribe in the area of Abu Hamed (E 33.18°) and the downstream Shaiqiyah tribe past the village of Birti (E 32.15°), (cf. LAGNAH 2005:2). Dar al-Manasir is covering a distance of approximately 130 km along the Nile with most villages lined up along the left river bank called "Western side" (…). But the heart of Dar al-Manasir consists of 14 islands, twelve of them permanently inhabited; al-Qanaweit, Shiri, Kidir, Sherari, Sur, Us, Tibit (…), Dumag, Buni, Arag, Dirbi and Birti, (cf. SALIH 1999:8, LAGNAH 2005:2).

Climate 

The climate is arid with an annual rainfall of about 50 mm in good years. The exact amount and spatial distribution of the precipitation during the rainy season in the months of August until October is highly variable and therefore unpredictable. The rainy season coincides with the flood season of the Nile (cf. SALIH 1999:9).

Economy 

The Manasir pursue small scale agriculture in the immediate vicinity of the Nile. Tiny pockets of alluvial sediments and the seasonally inundated riverside land are intensively irrigated and cultivated. The most important cash crops of the region are dates (cf. Date cultivation in Dar al-Manasir). During good rainy seasons, in which grazing grounds are abundant, many male Manasir join members of their tribe in the adjacent Bayudah Desert.

Administration 

Politically Dar al-Manasir belongs to the River Nile state ( Wilāya nahr an-Nīl). The administrative centre with the only local run police station, branch of the Agricultural Bank and Secondary Schools for both sexes is Shiri on Shiri Island.

Dar al-Manasir is among the most neglected areas in Northern Sudan. Apart from basic educational institutions virtually no public infrastructure such as tarred roads, bridges or ferry boats and hospitals exist. But the Manasir are also aware of advantages of this situation and describe them in terms of exceptional safety and honesty, tranquillity, untainted beauty of their country and cleanness of the water which they drink straight out of the Nile. The landscape, described by Innes (1931:184) as "most barren and the most beautiful" along the Nile, is rocky, picturesque and referred by the inhabitants happily as "our rocks".

Dar al-Manasir with all its villages and agricultural land will be successively flooded in the coming months by the Merowe Dam project. Its residents are going to be moved, but the exact relocation area is still not clear and a matter of ongoing discussion.

See also
Date cultivation in Dar al-Manasir

References 
Gray, T. (1949): "The Fourth Cataract". In: Sudan Notes and Records, Vol.30, p. 120-121.
Innes, N. MCL. (1930): "The Monasir Country". In: Sudan Notes and Records, Vol.14, p. 185-191.
Lagnah al-Tanfidhiyah lil-Muta'thirin (2005): Khasan al-Hamdab wa Qissah Tahgir Ahali al-Manasir. 20 p.
Salih, A. M. (1999): The Manasir of the Northern Sudan: Land and People. A Riverain Society and Resource Scarcity. 282 p.

Additional references
Al-Hakem, A.M.A. (1993): "Merowe (Hamdab) High Dam and its Impacts". In: Kush XVI, 25 p.
Beck. K. (1997): "Wer kennt schon Hamdab? Ein Staudammvorhaben im Sudan". In: Pörtge, K.-H. (ed.): Forschungen im Sudan. Erfurter Geographische Studien, Bd.5, pp. 79–88.
Beck, K. (1999): "Escaping from the Narrow Confines – Returning to Tight Communities.  Manasir Labour Migration from the Area of the Fourth Nile Cataract". In: Hahn, H.P. & G. Spittler (ed.): Afrika und die Globalisierung, pp. 201–211.
Beck, K. (2001): "Die Aneignung der Maschine". In: Kohl, K.-H. & N. Schafhausen (ed.): New Heimat. Katalog zur Ausstellung im Frankfurter Kunstverein, pp. 66–77.
Cavendish, M. W. (1966): "The Custom of Placing Pebbles on Nubian Graves". In: Sudan Notes and Records, Vol.47. pp. 151–156.
Corkill N.L. (1948): "Weight Equivalent of Sudan Foods sold by Measures of Capacity". In: Sudan Notes and Records, Vol.29, pp. 126–127.
Crowfoot, J. W. (1918): "Customs of the Rubatab". In: Sudan Notes and Records, Vol.1. pp. 119–134.
Gray, T. (1949): "The Fourth Cataract". In: Sudan Notes and Records, Vol.30, p. 120-121.
Innes, N. McL. (1930): "The Monasir Country". In: Sudan Notes and Records, Vol.14, pp. 185–191.
Jackson, H.C. (1926): "A Trek in Abu Hamed District". In: Sudan Notes and Records, Vol.9 No.2, pp. 1–35.
Lagnah aL-Tanfidhiyah lil-Muta'thirin (2005): Khasan al-Hamdab wa Qissah Tahgir Ahali al-Manasir. pp. 20 (اللجنة التنفيذية للمتأثرين (2005): خزان الحامداب و قصة تهجير أهالي المناصير)
Leach, T.A. (1919): "Date-Trees in Halfa Province". In: Sudan Notes and Records, Vol.2, pp. 98–104.
Nicholls, W. (1918): "The Sakia in Dongola Province". In: Sudan Notes and Records, Vol.1. pp. 21–24.

Related books 

Bashir, al-N. T. al-S. (ed.), (1997): Diwan 'Abqariah al-Manasir. Li-Ustadh Ibrahim 'Ali al-Sha'ir. 189 p.  (النذير تاج السر البشير(جمع وإعداد), (1997): ديوان عبقرية المناصير. للأستاذ إبراهيم علي الشاعر)
Qasim, 'A. al-Sh. (2002): Qamus al-Lahgah al-'Amiya fi al-Sudan, 3rd ed. 1076 p. (عون الشريف قاسم (2002): قاموس اللهجة العامية في السودان. الطبعة الثالثة. الدار السودانية للكتب)
Salih, A. M. (1999): The Manasir of the Northern Sudan: Land and People. A Riverain Society and Resource Scarcity. 282 p.
Taiyeb, M. Al-T. et al. (1969): Al-Turath al-Sha'ibi li-Qabilah al-Manasir. Salsalah Dirasat fi al-Turath al-Sudani. Khartoum University Faculty of Adab. 155 p. (الطيب محمد الطيب و عبد السلام سليمان و علي سعد (1969): التراث الشعبي لقبيلة المناصير. سلسلة دراسات في التراث السوداني, جامعة الخرطوم, كلية الآداب)
Yusif, A.A. (1995): Al-Nakhil (First Part), Khartoum. 349 p. (عبدلله أحمد يوسف (1995): النخيل – الجزء الأولى الخرطوم)

External links 
 Homepage of Dar al-Manasir
 Gallery of Dar al-Manasir
 Al-Turath al-Sha'ibi li-Qabilah al-Manasir
 Diwan 'Abqariah al-Manasir. Li-Ustadh Ibrahim 'Ali al-Sha'ir
 Homepage of the Humboldt University Nubian Expedition (H.U.N.E.)

Regions of Sudan
Nubia
Nile
Geography of Sudan